Mill Brook Reservoir is a man-made lake located by New Berlin, New York. Fish species present in the lake include pumpkinseed sunfish, and rainbow trout. There is access via boat launch off Nate Clark Lane.

References

Lakes of New York (state)
Lakes of Chenango County, New York